Filistata maguirei is a species of the araneomorph spider family Filistatidae.

Distribution 
This species is endemic to Hormozgan Province, Iran.

Description 
The male holotype measured 5.5 mm and the female paratype measured 9.5 mm.

Etymology 
This species was named after actor Tobey Maguire, who played Spider-Man in Sam Raimi's trilogy.

See also 
 List of organisms named after famous people (born 1950–present)

References 

Endemic fauna of Iran
Filistatidae
Spiders of Asia
Spiders described in 2015